Shamil Altaevich Sabirov (born 4 April 1959) is a retired Russian light-flyweight boxer. He won gold medals at the 1979 European Championships and 1980 Olympics, becoming the only boxing champion from the Soviet Union at the Moscow Olympics.

Sabirov took up boxing in 1973 and retired in 1985 with a record of 160 wins in 180 bouts. He graduated from an institute of physical education and holds a PhD in pedagogy. After retiring from competitions he mostly worked as a boxing coach and referee. In 2006 he started a career in politics as a member of the Russian party Rodina.

1980 Olympic record
Below are the results of Shamil Sabirov, a light flyweight boxer from the Soviet union, who competed at the 1980 Moscow Olympics:

 Round of 32: bye
 Round of 16: defeated Joao Manuel Miguel (Portugal) on points, 5-0
 Quarterfinal: defeated Dietmer Geilich (East Germany) on points, 4-1
 Semifinal: defeated Li Byong-Uk (North Korea) on points, 5-0
 Final: defeated Hipolito Ramos (Cuba) on points, 3-2 (won gold medal)

References 

1959 births
Living people
Soviet male boxers
Honoured Masters of Sport of the USSR
Olympic boxers of the Soviet Union
Boxers at the 1980 Summer Olympics
Olympic gold medalists for the Soviet Union
Olympic medalists in boxing
Jewish boxers
Russian Jews
Soviet Jews
Russian male boxers
Medalists at the 1980 Summer Olympics
Light-flyweight boxers
People from Karpinsk
Sportspeople from Sverdlovsk Oblast